Guillermo Giorgi is a former Uruguayan sprint canoer. He competed in the 2007 Pan American Games in his canoe.  He is now the coach of his club, Escuela de Canotaje Santiago Vázquez.

References 

Year of birth missing (living people)
Living people
Uruguayan male canoeists
Pan American Games competitors for Uruguay
Canoeists at the 2007 Pan American Games